This is a list of aircraft manufacturers sorted alphabetically by International Civil Aviation Organization (ICAO)/common name. It contains the ICAO/common name, manufacturers name(s), country and other data, with the known years of operation in parentheses.

The ICAO names are listed in bold. Having an ICAO name does not mean that a manufacturer is still in operation today. Just that some of the aircraft produced by that manufacturer are still flying.

T
TAI, Turkish Aerospace Industries – Turkey
Taifun, Taifun Experimental Design Bureau – Russia
Taiwan Dancer, Nangang Village, Dayuan District, Taoyuan City, Taiwan
Tamarind, Tamarind International Ltd – United States
Tampier, Tampier – France
Taneja, Taneja Aerospace and Aviation Ltd – India
Tapanee, Tanapee Aviation Inc – Canada
Taylor (1), Taylor Aircraft Company – United States
Taylor (2), Moulton B. Taylor – United States
Taylor (3), C. Gilbert Taylor – United States
Taylor (3), Taylor Aero Inc – United States
Taylor (4), John F. Taylor – United Kingdom
Taylor Kits, Taylor Kits Corporation – United States
Taylorcraft (1), Taylorcraft Aircraft – United States
Taylorcraft (1), Taylorcraft Aviation Company – United States
Taylorcraft (1), Taylorcraft Aviation Corporation – United States
Taylorcraft (1), Taylorcraft Inc – United States
Taylorcraft (2), Taylorcraft Aeroplanes (England) Ltd – United Kingdom, (1938–1946) > Auster
Taylor-Young, Taylor-Young Airplane Company – United States
TBM, TBM Corporation – France/United States
TBM, TBM SA – France
Teal, Teal Aircraft Corporation – United States
Team Rocket, Team Rocket Inc – United States
Team Tango, Revolution Aviation Inc., Williston, Florida, United States
Tech'aero, Tech'Aero – France
Technic'air, Belvès, France
Technoavia, Nauchno-Kommerchesky Firma Technoavia – Russia
Technoflug, Technoflug Leichtflugzeugbau GmbH – Germany
Tecma Sport, La Roche-sur-Foron, France
Tecnam, Costruzioni AeronauticheTecnam Srl – Italy
Ted Smith, Ted R. Smith & Associates – United States
Ted Smith, Ted Smith Aerostar Corporation – United States
Ted Smith, Ted Smith Aircraft Company Inc – United States
Temco, Temco Aircraft Corporation – United States
Temco, Texas Engineering & Manufacturing Company Inc – United States
Tennessee Valley, Tennessee Valley Aviation Products Ltd – United States
Teratorn Aircraft, Clear Lake, Iowa, United States
Terr-Mar, Terr-Mar Aviation Corporation – Canada
Terzi, Terzi Aerodine – Italy
Texas Airplane, Texas Airplane Factory – United States
Texas Helicopter, Texas Helicopter Corporation – United States
Thomas-Martin, Thomas-Martin – Unknown
Thaden Metal Aircraft Company, United States
The Airplane Factory, Tedderfield Airpark, Eikenhof, Johannesburg South, South Africa
Theiss Aviation, Salem, Ohio, United States
Thorp, John W. Thorp – United States
Thorp, Thorp 211 Aircraft Company Inc – United States
Thorp, Thorp Aero Inc – United States
Thorp, Thorp Aircraft – United States
Thorp, Thorp Engineering Company – United States
Thrush, Thrush Aircraft Inc – United States
Thruster Air Services, Langworth, Lincoln, England, United Kingdom
Thunder Wings, Thunder Wings, Division of Thunder Development Inc – United States
Thurston, Thurston Aeromarine Corporation – United States
Thurston, Thurston Aircraft Corporation – United States
Tiger, Tiger Aircraft LLC – United States
Time to Fly,  Kaunas, Lithuania
Time Warp, Time Warp Aircraft Inc – United States
Tipsy, Ernest Oscar Tips – Belgium
Titan, Titan Aircraft Company – United States
TM Aircraft, TM Aircraft – United States
TNCA, Talleres Nacionales de Construcciones Aeronáuticas – Mexico
Tomark, Tomark s.r.o., Prešov, Slovakia
Toyota, Toyota Motor Corporation – Japan
Tradewind Turbines, Tradewind Turbines Corporation – United States
Trago Mills, Trago Mills – United Kingdom
Transall, Arbeitsgemeinschaft Transall – Germany/France
Transavia Corporation, Transavia Corporation Pty Ltd – Australia
Transavia, Transavia Division of Transfield (NSW) Pty Ltd – Australia
Trans-Florida, Trans Florida Aviation – United States, > Cavalier Aircraft
Travel Air, Travel Air Company – United States, (1924–1931) > Curtiss-Wright Aeronautical Corporation
Travel Air, Travel Air Manufacturing Company Inc – United States
Trecker, Trecker Aircraft Corporation – United States
Trekking Parapentes, Saint-Mathieu-de-Tréviers, France
Triavio, (Triavio SRL), Catania, Italy
Tridair, Tridair Helicopters Inc – United States
Trident, Trident Aircraft Ltd – Canada
Trio-Twister, Eichwalde, Germany
TRI-R, Tri-R Technologies Inc – United States
Triumph, Triumph Group Inc – United States 
Trixy Aviation Products GmbH, Dornbirn, Austria
Tucker, Tucker Aviation Company – United States
Tugan Aircraft, Tugan Aircraft Company Limited – Australia, (?-1936) > Commonwealth Aircraft Corporation
Tupolev, Aviatsionny Nauchno-Tekhnishesky Kompleks Imeni A N Tupoleva OAO – Russia
Tupolev, Tupolev OKB – Russia
Turbine Design, Turbine Design Inc – United States
Turner, E. L. Turner – United States
TUSAS, TUSAS Aerospace Industries Inc – Turkey
TUSAS, TUSAS Havacilik ve Uzay Sanayi AS – Turkey
TUSCO, Tulsa Manufacturing Corporation – United States
TWI, TWI Flugzeuggesellschaft mbH – Germany

U
Udet, Udet-Flugzeugbau GmbH – Germany
Uetz, Walter Uetz Flugzeugbau – Switzerland
UL-Jih, Kaplice, Czech Republic
UFO, Ultimate Flying Object Inc – New Zealand
Ullmann, Ullmann Aircraft Company – United States
Ultimate, Ultimate Aircraft Division of Ultimate Aerobatics Ltd – Canada
Ultravia, Ultravia Aero International Inc – Canada
Umbaugh, Umbaugh Aircraft Corporation – United States
Umbra, Aeronautica Umbra – Italy
UNC, UNC Helicopter – United States
Unikomtranso, Unikomtranso AO – Russia
Unis, Unis Obchodni spol sro – Czech Republic
United Canada, United Aircraft of Canada – Canada
United Aircraft Corporation, United Aircraft Corporation – Russia
United Consultant, United Consultant Corporation – United States
UP International GmbH, Garmisch-Partenkirchen, Germany, formerly known as UP Europe, UP Products and Ultralite Products
Urban, Urban Air sro – Czech Republic
Utilicraft Aerospace Industries, Utilicraft Aerospace Industries – United States
U-Turn GmbH, Villingen-Schwenningen, Germany
UTVA, UTVA Fabrika Aviona – Yugoslavia, (1937–Present)
UTVA, UTVA-Sour Metalne Industrije, RO Fabrika Aviona – Yugoslavia

V
Valentin, Valentin Flugzeugbau GmbH – Germany
Valladeau, Valladeau – France
Valmet, Valmet Aviation Industries – Finland
Valmet, Valmet OY, Kuoreveden Tehdas (Kuorevesi Works) – Kuorevesi, Finland
Valmet, Valmet OY, Lentokonetehdas (Aircraft Factory) – Tampere, Finland
Valtion Lentokonetehdas (VL; Government Aircraft Factory) – Helsinki and Tampere, Finland
Valtion Metallitehtaat (VMT; Government Metal Factories) – Finland
Vancil, Belton, South Carolina, United States
Van's, Van's Aircraft Inc – United States
Vardax, Vardax Corporation – United States
Varga, Varga Aircraft Corporation – United States
VAT, Vertical Aviation Technologies Inc – United States
VEB, Vereinigung Volkseigener Betriebe Flugzeugbau Dresden – Germany
VEF, Valsts Elektrotehniska Fabrika – Latvia, (State Electrotechnical Plant)
Veljekset Karhumaki, Veljekset Karhumaki OY – Finland
Velocity, Velocity Inc – United States
Venture, Venture Light Aircraft Resources LLC – United States
Verilite, Verilite Aircraft Company Inc – United States
Vertol, Vertol Aircraft Company – United States, (1956–1960) > Boeing
VFW, Vereinigte Flugtechnische Werke GmbH – Germany
Verville Aircraft – United States
VFW, VFW-Fokker GmbH – Germany
Vickers, Vickers (Aviation) Ltd – United Kingdom
Vickers, Vickers-Armstrongs (Aircraft) Ltd – United Kingdom
Vickers-Slingsby, Vickers-Slingsby Division of Vickers Ltd Offshore Engineering Group – United Kingdom
Victa, Victa Ltd – Australia
Victory Aircraft, Victory Aircraft Company – Canada, (?-1945) > Avro Canada
Vidor, Giuseppe Vidor – Italy
Viking Air, North Saanich, British Columbia, Canada
Viking Aircraft Inc, Panama City Beach, Florida, United States
Viking Aircraft LLC, Elkhorn, Wisconsin, United States
Viking, Viking Aircraft Ltd – United States
Viper, Viper Aircraft Corporation – United States
Visionaire, VisionAire Corporation – United States
Vitek, Kompaniya Vitek – Russia
Voisin, Appareils d'Aviation Les Frères Voisin – France, (Les Frères Voisin)
Volaircraft, Volaircraft Inc – United States
Volmer, Volmer Aircraft – United States
Volmer, Volmer Jensen – United States
Volpar, Volpar Inc – United States
Vortech, Inc., Fallston, Maryland, United States
Vought, Vought Aircraft Company – United States, (1961–1976)
Vought, Vought Corporation – United States
Vought-Sikorsky, Vought-Sikorsky Division of United Aircraft – United States
VSR, VSR – United States
VSTOL, V-STOL Aircraft Corporation – United States
VTOL Aircraft, VTOL Aircraft Pty Ltd – Australia
Vulcan Motor and Engineering, Vulcan Motor and Engineering Company Ltd. – United Kingdom
VulcanAir, VulcanAir SpA – Italy
Vultee, Vultee Aircraft Division of Avco – United States, (?-1943) > Convair
Vultee, Vultee Aircraft Inc – United States

W
WACO, Weaver Aircraft Company – United States
Waco, Advance Aircraft Company – United States
Waco, Waco Aircraft Company – United States
WACO Classic Aircraft, Waco Classic Aircraft Corporation – United States
Wagaero, WagAero Inc, Lyons, Wisconsin, United States
Walkerjet, Třemošná, Czech Republic
Wallerkowski, Heinz Wallerkowski – Germany
WAR, War Aircraft Replicas – United States
WAR, War Aircraft Replicas International Inc – United States
Warner (1), Richard Warner Aviation Inc – United States
Warner Aircraft Corporation (c1930s) – United States
Warner Aerocraft, United States
Wasp Systems, later Wasp Flight Systems, Crook, Cumbria, United Kingdom
Wassmer, Société des Etablissements Benjamin Wassmer – France
Wassmer, Wassmer Aviation SA – France
Watanabe, Watanabe Aircraft Plant – Japan, > Kyūshū
Watson, Gary Watson – United States
Weatherly, Weatherly Aviation Company Inc – United States
Wedell-Williams, Wedell-Williams Air Service Corporation – United States
Weir, G. and J. Weir – United Kingdom
Wendt, Wendt Aircraft Engineering – United States
Werft Warnemünde, Werft Warnemünde – Germany, (1917–1925) > Arado
Weser Flugzeugbau GmbH, Weser Flugzeugbau GmbH – Germany, (Weserflug)
West Australian Airways, West Australian Airways – Australia
Western, Western Aircraft Supplies – Canada
Westland, GKN Westland Helicopters Ltd – United Kingdom
Westland, Westland Aircraft Ltd – United Kingdom
Westland, Westland Helicopters Ltd – United Kingdom
Weymann-Lepere, Weymann-Lepere (Societe des Avions) – France
Whatley, Vascoe Whatley Jr – United States
Wheeler, Wheeler Aircraft Company – United States
Wheeler, Wheeler Technology Inc – United States
White, E. Marshall White – United States
White Lightning, White Lightning Aircraft Corporation – United States
Whittlesey Body, Whittlesey Body Co. Inc. – United States
Wilden, Helmut Wilden – Germany
Wills Wing, Santa Ana, California, United States
Windecker, Windecker Industries Inc – United States
Windexair, Windexair AB – Sweden
Winds Italia, Bologna, Italy
Windspire Inc., Long Green, Maryland, United States
Windtech Parapentes, Gijón, Spain
Windward Performance, Windward Performance – United States
Wing Aeronautical Solutions, Wing Aeronautical Solutions – Portugal
Wing, Wing Aircraft Company – United States
Wings of Change, Fulpmes, Austria
Wings Of Freedom,  Hubbard, Ohio, United States
Wingtip To Wingtip, Wingtip to Wingtip LLC – United States
Witteman-Lewis, Witteman-Lewis Aircraft Company- United States
Wittman, Steve J. Wittman – United States
Wolf, Donald S. Wolf – United States
Wolfsberg, Wolfsberg Aircraft Corporation NV – Belgium
Wolfsberg, Wolfsberg-Evektor SRO – Czech Republic
Wolfsberg, Wolfsberg Letecká továrna SRO – Czech Republic
Wombat Gyrocopters, St Columb, Cornwall, United Kingdom
Woods, H. L. Woods – United States
Worldwide Ultralite Industries, United States
Wren, Wren Aircraft Corporation – United States
Wright Aeronautical, Wright Aeronautical – United States, (1919–1929)
Wright Company, Wright Company – United States, (1909–1916)
Wright-Martin, Wright-Martin – United States, (1916–1919)
WRM Motors of Oxford, WRM Motors of Oxford – United Kingdom, (William Richard Morris)
Wrobel, Gerard Wrobel, Beynes, Alpes-de-Haute-Provence, France
WSK, Wytwórnia Sprzetu Komunikacyjnego – Poland
Wuhan, Wuhan Helicopter General Aviation Corporation – China
Wüst, Wüst GmbH – Germany
 Wytwórnia i Naprawa Konstrukcji Lekkich (Wytwórnia i Naprawa Konstrukcji Lekkich) – Poland, (1996–1999)
WZL 3, Wojskowe Zaklady Lotnicze Nr. 3 – Poland

X
Xian, Xian Aircraft Company – China
Xplorer UltraFlight, Cape Town, South Africa
XtremeAir, Cochstedt, Germany

Y
Yakovlev, Moskovskii Mashinostroitelnyy Zavod "Skorost" Imeni A. S. Yakovleva – Russia
Yakovlev, Opytno-Konstruktorskoye Byuro Imeni A S Yakovleva OAO – Russia
Yakovlev, Yakovlev Aviatsionnoye Korporatsiya OAO – Russia
Yakovlev, Yakovlev OKB – Russia
Yalo, Zaklad Naprawy i Budowy Sprzetu Latajacego Yalo SC – Poland
Yokosuka Naval Arsenal, Yokosuka Naval Arsenal – Japan, (aka First Naval Air Technical Arsenal)

Z
Zenair, Zenair Ltd – Canada
Zenith, Zénith Aircraft Company – United States
Zero Gravity Paragliders, JM International Company Limited, Seoul, South Korea
ZLIN Aircraft, ZLIN Aircraft a.s. – Czech Republic
Zivko, Zivko Aeronautics Inc – United States
Zlin Aviation, Zlin Aviation s.r.o. – Czech Republic
Zmaj, Fabrika aviona Zmaj – Yugoslavia

See also
 Aircraft
 List of aircraft engine manufacturers
 List of aircraft manufacturers

T